In the Blind Spot is a 2023 German drama thriller film directed and written by Ayşe Polat. Starring Katja Bürkle, Ahmet Varlı, Çağla Yurga and Aybi Era, the film is about Melek, a 7–year–old Turkish girl and her father Zafer, who are drawn into a complex net of conspiracy, paranoia and generational trauma. It is selected in Encounter at the 73rd Berlin International Film Festival, where it had its world premiere on 19 February 2023.

Synopsis
In a remote Kurdish village, in northeastern Turkey, a documentary is shot by German film crew. They spot an old woman performing ritual to memory of her missing son. In the village, Melek, a 7-year-old Turkish girl lives, whose nanny is the Kurdish translator of the film crew. Zafer, her father works for an ominous group. When she apparently get haunted by unknown power, he gets caught between loyalty to them and fear for his family's well-being. This eventually developes into a ruinous force. The film unravels a complex net of conspiracy, paranoia and generational trauma.

Cast
  as Simone
  as Zafer
 Çağla Yurga as Melek
  as Leyla 
 Maximilian Hemmersdorfer as Christian
 Nihan Okutucu as Sibel
 Tudan Ürper as Hatice
 Mutallip Müjdeci as Hasan
 Rıza Akın as Burhan
 Aziz Çapkurt as Eyüp

Production
The film was shot from 24 April 2021 to 24 June 2021 in Turkey and Hamburg.

Reception
Vladan Petkovic for Cineuropa wrote, "The film combines its key cinematography with smartphone videos and hidden-camera footage, which makes it feel expansive and rich on the surface, but the overly tidy editing makes the film's structure too obvious, stripping it of movie magic."

Accolades

References

External links

 In the Blind Spot at Berlinale
 In the Blind Spot at  ArtHood Entertainment

2023 films
2020s thriller films
2023 thriller drama films
German thriller films
2020s German-language films
2020s German films
Films shot in Turkey
German multilingual films